Counselor is an unincorporated community in Sandoval County, New Mexico, United States. Counselor is located at the junction of U.S. Route 550 and New Mexico State Road 403. It is a chapter of the Navajo Nation. It is named after Jim Counselor, who traded in the area in the first decades of the 20th century.

Education
It is in Cuba Independent Schools.

References 

Unincorporated communities in Sandoval County, New Mexico
Unincorporated communities in New Mexico
Sandoval County, New Mexico
Navajo Nation